The 1977 Hong Kong Urban Council election was held on 3 March 1977 for the six of the 12 elected seats of the Urban Council of Hong Kong. 7,308 voters cast ballots, 19.7 per cent of the 37,174 registered electorate, about 3,000 less than last election and the lowest turnout in ten years.

The Reform Club of Hong Kong and the Hong Kong Civic Association each put up five and four candidates respectively and there was also one independent candidate Tsin Sai-nin seeking for re-election. All six incumbents were returned out of the 10 candidates with Edmund Chow receiving the most votes, taking over veteran Brook Bernacchi.

Overview of outcome

Citations

References
UK Parliament. Hong Kong Urban Council. HC Deb 5 April 1977 vol 929 cc412-6W.

Hong Kong
1977 in Hong Kong
Urban
March 1977 events in Asia
1977 elections in the British Empire